Eucalyptus mooreana, commonly known as Moore's gum, mountain white gum or King Leopold Range mallee, is a species of stunted, straggly tree or mallee that is endemic to the Kimberley region of Western Australia. It has smooth, powdery white bark, a crown of juvenile, sessile, stem-clasping leaves arranged in opposite pairs, flower buds arranged in groups of seven, white flowers and cup-shaped to hemispherical fruit.

Description
It has smooth white, powdery bark that is shed annually to reveal pale pink new bark, and small branches that are glaucous. The leaves are the same shade of dull greyish green to glaucous on both sides. Flowering occurs between May and August and the flowers are creamy white. Eucalyptus mooreana is similar in appearance to, and closely related to the kalumburu gum (E. herbertiana) and Halls Creek white gum (E. cupularis) but can be distinguished from them by its crown of stem-clasping,  juvenile leaves.

Taxonomy and naming
Eucalyptus mooreana  was formally described by William Vincent Fitzgerald and the description was published in "The Western Mail" newspaper on 2 June 1906. The specific epithet (mooreana) honours Newton James Moore who was Minister of Lands at the time. Further descriptions of the species as E. mooreana (W.V.Fitzg.) Maiden were published in 1920 by Joseph Maiden in his book A Critical Revision of the genus Eucalyptus but the Australian Plant Census accepts Fitzgerald's original 1906 publication.

Distribution and habitat
Eucalyptus mooreana is found on steep rocky slopes and summits in a small area of the Kimberley region of Western Australia where it grows in red sandy soils over sandstone or quartzite in the Wunaamin Miliwundi Ranges. One of the populations comprised 150 individual plants while the others have not been surveyed.

Conservation status
In 2008 the species is listed as "vulnerable" under the Australian Federal GovernmentEnvironment Protection and Biodiversity Conservation Act 1999 and as "Threatened Flora (Declared Rare Flora — Extant)" by the Department of Environment and Conservation (Western Australia) meaning that it is likely to become extinct or is rare, or otherwise in need of special protection. The main threats to the species are fire and grazing by cattle.

See also
List of Eucalyptus species

References

Eucalypts of Western Australia
mooreana
Myrtales of Australia
Plants described in 1906
Taxa named by William Vincent Fitzgerald